The Robert B. Atwood Building is an office building located at 550 West 7th Avenue in Downtown Anchorage, Alaska. The building houses government offices for the State of Alaska. Standing at 20 stories and 81 m (265 ft), it is the second-tallest building in Alaska. Originally intended to be taller, it was limited in height by the FAA due to its proximity to Merril Field Airport. The building was formerly known as the Bank of America Center. Together with the slightly taller Conoco-Phillips Building, this high-rise helps define the Anchorage skyline.

Facilities
A landscaped plaza is featured on the building's east side. The single-story basement is used as a parking level. There are nine elevators in the building. Amenities include teleconferencing-enabled conference rooms, vending and break rooms, and a central mail room.

Parking garage
The State of Alaska completed a new parking garage in 2008 across the street from the Robert B. Atwood Building. The garage is named the Linny Pacillo Parking Garage after local parking activist Carolyn 'Linny' Pacillo who, with her sister, Susan, became famous during the 1990s for wearing tutus and plugging parking meters downtown in protest to strict parking enforcement. The sisters were dubbed the Parking Fairies. Linny Pacillo died in 2006.

Involvement in seismic research
In 2003, the United States Geological Survey (USGS) installed a network of accelerometers throughout the building to monitor the effects of earthquakes on tall buildings. The Atwood Building was selected due to the unique properties of the "Bootlegger Cove Formation" soil it stands on, and the historical seismicity of the region (see Good Friday earthquake.) The mission of the research is to better understand the effects of seismicity on similar buildings to better prepare them for future large earthquakes.

The USGS has since published a video created by S. Farid Ghahari, Mehmet Çelebi, and Ertugrul Taciroglu, which shows movement of the Atwood building during a M7 event in January, 2016.

History
The architect for the Atwood building was Harold Wirum & Associates. The building officially opened for business on March 17, 1983, although only 15% of the office space was occupied. The building was scheduled to be opened up April 1st, but a man by the name Fred McCallister convinced them to have it opened on St. Patrick's Day, the top floor was used the opening night as a St. Patrick's Day celebration. The building was developed by NB Hunt Trust Estate who filed for bankruptcy from the Silver Thursday debacle in the late 80s.  After Chapter 11 was filed, ownership of the building was transferred to Equitable Life Assurance in September 1988 that later sold their interest in the building to the State of Alaska in 1997 for $27 million.

Namesake
The building was originally named after the original owner Nelson Bunker Hunt as the Hunt Building.  It was renamed the Enserch Center in September 1985 and later renamed again as the Bank of America Center.  Most recently it was named after Robert Bruce Atwood, an Alaska statehood activist and Anchorage Times editor and publisher.

See also
 Conoco-Phillips Building
 List of tallest buildings in Anchorage
 Nelson Bunker Hunt

References

1983 establishments in Alaska
Office buildings completed in 1983
Skyscrapers in Anchorage, Alaska
Skyscraper office buildings in Alaska